HD 111395 is a single, variable star in the northern constellation of Coma Berenices. It has the variable star designation LW Com, short for LW Comae Berenices; HD 111395 is the Henry Draper Catalogue designation. The star has a yellow hue and is just bright enough to be barely visible to the naked eye with an apparent visual magnitude that fluctuates around 6.29. Based upon parallax measurements, it is located at a distance of 55.8 light years from the Sun. The star is drifting closer with a radial velocity of −8.9 km/s. It is a member of the Eta Chamaeleontis stellar kinematic group.

This object is a G-type main-sequence star with a stellar classification of G7V. It is a BY Draconis variable that varies in brightness by about 0.10 magnitude over a period of 15.8 days, which is interpreted as the rotation period of the star. (Messina et al. (2003) suspect the actual rotation period may be half that: 7.9 days.) It has an active chromosphere and is a source for X-ray emission.

The star is around a billion years old with a projected rotational velocity of 3.8 km/s. It has slightly above solar metallicity − the term astronomers use for the relative abundance of elements other than hydrogen and helium. The mass of the star is 8% greater than the Sun, but it has 93% of the Sun's radius.

References

G-type main-sequence stars
BY Draconis variables
Circumstellar disks

Coma Berenices
4864
Durchmusterung objects
Gliese and GJ objects
111395
62523
Comae Berenices, LW